Kamavarapukota is a mandal in Eluru district in the state of Andhra Pradesh in India.

Demographics
According to Indian census, total population of Kamavarapukota Mandal is 53,592 living in 13,205 Houses, it has 41 villages and 14 panchayats. Of which Males are 27,107 and Females are 26,485.

Towns and villages
 census, the mandal has 15 villages. The settlements in the mandal are listed below:

 Ankalampadu
 Edavalli
 Guntupalle
 Kallacheruvu
 Kamavarapukota
 Khandrika Seetharamavaram
 Kondagudem
 Mankenapalle
 Polasigudem
 Rajunagulapalle
 Ramannapalem
 Ravikampadu
 Tadikalapudi
 Uppalapadu
 Vadlapatlanuthanam

References

Mandals in Eluru district